Stop Me If You've Heard This One Before, a 2008 novel by David Yoo, is a young adult novel described as “every bit as painfully funny, as thoroughly addictive, as his first.” It is his second book, published four years after his first effort “Girls For Breakfast”.

Plot

High school 
Albert was in self-imposed exile at local Bern High. After innumerable racial taunts and slurs, he had no friends. He no longer thought of girls, no longer looked people in the eye, ate lunch alone and got in the habit of carrying an entire day’s text books on his person, so as not to risk visiting his locker, for fear of being stuffed in it by one of the jocks from the lacrosse team.

Albert’s clueless Korean-American immigrant parents have traditionally overloaded their hapless son each summer with more activities than he had during the school year. However, when Albert finished his sophomore year in high school, in a rare moment of diplomacy, his parents offered him an alternative...get a summer job.

The Inn 

Albert found a job at the nearby Bern Inn more appealing than another unmitigated disaster of a summer camp run by Symposium for Teenage Development (STD). His co-worker at the Inn was the smart, popular and beautiful Mia Stone, who often functioned as ‘arm-candy’ for the hero of Bern High, the obnoxious Adonis, Ryan Stackhouse or simply ‘The House’, the star of the lacrosse team.

In his isolation, Albert had suppressed his sexuality and found himself literally paralyzed and speechless on meeting the beautiful Mia. He was barely able to lift his right-hand palm outstretched. Mia did likewise and said “How” in a deep voice, mimicking an Indian greeting.

After this inauspicious beginning Albert and Mia spent the summer vacuuming each of the rooms of the Bern Inn. “Entertain me monkey” demanded Mia, so Albert brought cards and invented other games to amuse Mia during breaks. The most esoteric of these games was the Damnit game, whose object was to discover the rules of the game during the game.

At the end of summer Albert and Mia met at the small lake in the woods, between the Inn and Albert’s house. They threw stones at the large frogs in the lake without hitting them. When it started raining they both got thoroughly wet, but neither wanted to go home. Suddenly, Albert and Mia rushed into each other and started kissing passionately. “Are we something?”, asked Albert. “Yes, we are definitely something,”, replied Mia.

Ryan's Illness 

Albert returned to high school a changed man. He looked people in the eye and joined others for lunch, though he passed on the lunch-lady’s take on Chicken Cordon Bleu, substituting bologna for ham. Albert’s idyllic existence was shattered when a concerned Mia informed him that her former boyfriend, Ryan Stackhouse, had cancer and would need her help while in the hospital. Ryan now monopolized all of Mia’s spare time and it became apparent to Albert that
Ryan was using his cancer to win back his old girlfriend.

The Walk 

Ryan now acquired ‘fallen hero’ status at Bern High. Pictures and banners of support were everywhere. Mia explained that Ryan had Hodgkin’s disease and had to have his spleen removed. Albert tried to make light of the situation, “I appreciate you spleening this to me,” he said, but Mia did not laugh. Mia attended Ryan’s bedside during his operation and stay in the hospital. Support for Ryan continued to escalate and included a candlelight vigil, a ‘Ryan’s Carnival’ and, after he was released from the hospital, ‘A Walk for Cancer’. The entire school participated in ‘The Walk’, but Albert and Ryan broke into a full sprint, while hurling insults at each other. When the still weakened Ryan hunched over, taking huge lungful of air, Mia, the organizer of ‘The Walk’ was crushed and rushed up crying. Essentially, Albert had defeated a guy with cancer during a Walk for Cancer in his honor. This was the end of Mia’s and Albert’s love affair.

Analysis 

This book is a love story, in fact, a story of first love. As Albert Kim, the second-generation Korean teenage protagonist points out, it is "a traditional love story in the sense that it ends badly." High school outcast Albert’s desperate attempts to win back his love interest are presented with such humor and empathy that it is impossible not to root for him.

The book was a selection for The Bloomsbury Review’s Editors’ Favorites of 2008.

Additionally, Yoo’s work is overlaid with urgent Korean-American immigrant angst, which though presented humorously, nevertheless has a ring of bitter truth, as evident in the quote from Lucia Berlin, author of The New York Times Bestseller, A Manual for Cleaning Women, cited in Yoo’s book, “They say a baby’s true baptism occurs when he first falls out of bed.”

References

External links
Book trailer for Stop Me If You've Heard This One Before

2008 American novels
Novels set in Boston
American young adult novels
Korean-American novels
Comedy books
Hyperion Books books